Maria Theresa of Spain (10 September 1638 – 30 July 1683) was Queen of France from 1660 to 1683 as the wife of King Louis XIV. She was born an Infanta of Spain and Portugal as the daughter of King Philip IV and Elisabeth of France, and was also an Archduchess of Austria as a member of the Spanish branch of the House of Habsburg.

Her marriage in 1660 to King Louis XIV, her double first cousin, was arranged with the purpose of ending the lengthy war between France and Spain. Famed for her virtue and piety, she saw five of her six children die in early childhood, and is frequently viewed as an object of pity in historical accounts of her husband's reign, since she was often neglected by the court and overshadowed by the King's many mistresses.

Without any political influence in the French court or government (except briefly in 1672, when she was named regent during her husband's absence during the Franco-Dutch War), she died at the age of 44 due to complications from an abscess on her arm. Her grandson Philip V inherited the Spanish throne in 1700 after the death of her younger half-brother, Charles II. The resulting War of the Spanish Succession established the House of Bourbon as the new ruling dynasty of Spain, where it has reigned with some interruption until the present time.

Biography

Birth and early life

Born at the Royal Monastery of El Escorial, the Infanta Maria Theresa was the daughter of Philip IV & III, and his first wife Elisabeth of France, who died when Maria Theresa was six years old. As a member of the House of Austria, Maria Theresa was entitled to use the title Archduchess of Austria. Elizabeth of France chose Sainte Thérèse to protect her daughter, the youngest of a series of precocious births. She gave her the name Thérèse to protect her, namely Marie-Thérèse. She was known in Spain as María Teresa de Austria and in France as Marie-Thérèse d'Autriche. 

She was raised by the royal governess Luisa Magdalena de Jesus. The religious education of Marie-Thérèse was carried out by Juan de Palma, commissioner of the Indies who had been the director of Elizabeth of France, was charged by Philippe IV to look after his daughter, as he had looked after the mother of the princess. Finally, in later times it was Father Vasquez, a man recognized in Spain for being highly educated and of great virtue; it was he who had been entrusted with the spiritual education of the young Infanta. 

Unlike France, the kingdom of Spain had no Salic Law, so it was possible for a female to assume the throne. When Maria Theresa's brother Balthasar Charles died in 1646, she became heir presumptive to the vast Spanish Empire and remained such until the birth of her brother Philip Prospero, in 1657.  She was briefly heir presumptive once more between 1–6 November 1661, following the death of Prince Philip and until the birth of Prince Charles, who would later inherit the thrones of Spain as Charles II.

In 1658, as war with France began to wind down, a union between the royal families of Spain and France was proposed as a means to secure peace. Maria Theresa and the French king were double first cousins: Louis XIV's father was Louis XIII of France, who was the brother of Maria Theresa's mother, while her father was brother to Anne of Austria, Louis XIV's mother. Spanish procrastination led to a scheme in which France's prime minister, Cardinal Mazarin, pretended to seek a marriage for his master with Margaret Yolande of Savoy. When Philip IV of Spain heard of a meeting at Lyon between the Houses of France and Savoy in November 1658, he reputedly exclaimed of the Franco-Savoyard union that "it cannot be, and will not be". Philip then sent a special envoy to the French court to open negotiations for peace and a royal marriage.

Marriage

The negotiations for the marriage contract were intense. Eager to prevent a union of the two countries or crowns, especially one in which Spain would be subservient to France, the diplomats sought to include a renunciation clause that would deprive Maria Theresa and her children of any rights to the Spanish succession. This was eventually done but, by the skill of Mazarin and his French diplomats, the renunciation and its validity were made conditional upon the payment of a large dowry. As it turned out, Spain, impoverished and bankrupt after decades of war, was unable to pay such a dowry, and France never received the agreed upon sum of 500,000 écus.

A marriage by proxy to the French king was held in Fuenterrabia. Her father and the entire Spanish court accompanied the bride to the Isle of Pheasants on the border in the Bidassoa river, where Louis and his court met her in the meeting on the Isle of Pheasants on 7 June 1660, and she entered France.  On 9 June the marriage took place in Saint-Jean-de-Luz at the recently rebuilt church of Saint Jean the Baptist. After the wedding, Louis wanted to consummate the marriage as quickly as possible.

Queen of France

On 26 August 1660, the newlyweds made the traditional Joyous Entry into Paris. Louis was faithful to his wife for the first year of their marriage, commanding the Grand Maréchal du Logis that "the Queen and himself were never to be set apart, no matter how small the house in which they might be lodging".

Maria Theresa was very fortunate to have found a friend at court in her mother-in-law, unlike many princesses in foreign lands. She continued to spend much of her free time playing cards and gambling, as she had no interest in politics or literature. Consequently, she was viewed as not fully playing the part of queen designated to her by her marriage. But more importantly, she became pregnant in early 1661, and a long-awaited son was born on 1 November 1661.

The first time Maria Theresa ever saw the Palace of Versailles was on 25 October 1660. At that time, it was just a small royal residence that had been Louis XIII's hunting lodge not far from Paris. Later, the first building campaign (1664–1668) commenced with the Plaisirs de l’Île enchantée of 1664, a week-long celebration at Versailles ostensibly held in honour of France's two queens, Louis XIV's mother and wife, but exposed Louise de La Vallière's role as the king's maîtresse-en-titre. The celebration of the Plaisirs de l’Île enchantée is often regarded as a prelude to the War of Devolution, which Louis waged against Spain. The first building campaign witnessed alterations in the château and gardens in order to accommodate the 600 guests invited to the celebration.

As time passed, Maria Theresa also came to tolerate her husband's prolonged infidelity with Françoise-Athénaïs, Marquise de Montespan. The king left her to her own devices, yet reprimanded Madame de Montespan when her behaviour at court too flagrantly disrespected the queen's position.

Later, the governess of Montespan's illegitimate children by the king, Madame de Maintenon, came to supplant her mistress in the king's affections. At first she resisted the king's advances and encouraged him to bestow more attention on his long-neglected wife, a thoughtfulness which Maria Theresa repaid with warmth toward the new favourite. After the queen's death, Maintenon would become the king's second, although officially secret, wife.

There have long been rumours that Maria Theresa had an illegitimate daughter, Louise Marie Thérèse (The Black Nun of Moret).

Maria Theresa played little part in political affairs except for the years 1667, 1672, and 1678, during which she acted as regent while her husband was away on campaigns on the frontier.

Death

During the last week of July 1683, Maria Theresa fell ill and, as her illness worsened, her husband ordered for the sacraments to be kept nearby. She died a painful death on 30 July 1683, at Versailles. Upon her death, Louis XIV said: "This is the first chagrin she has ever given me." For the grand funeral ceremony, Marc-Antoine Charpentier composed dramatic motets H.409, H.189, H.331 and Jean-Baptiste Lully his Dies irae. The funeral prayer was by Bossuet.

Of her six children, only one survived her, Louis, the oldest one, who died in 1711. One of her younger grandsons eventually inherited her claim to the Spanish throne to become King Philip V of Spain in 1700.

Issue
She married her double first cousin Louis XIV in 1660. The couple had six children, only one of whom survived to adulthood:

Louis, Grand Dauphin (1 November 1661 – 14 April 1711) married Maria Anna Victoria of Bavaria, had issue.
Anne-Élisabeth (18 November 1662 – 30 December 1662); died in infancy.
Marie-Anne (16 November 1664 – 26 December 1664); died in infancy.
Marie Thérèse (2 January 1667 – 1 March 1672); styled as Madame Royale, died at the age of five.
Philippe Charles (5 August 1668 – 10 July 1671); styled as Duke of Anjou, died at the age of two.
Louis François (14 June 1672 – 4 November 1672); styled Duke of Anjou, died in infancy.

Ancestry

References

Bibliography

External links
 
 Full text of marriage contract, France National Archives transcription 

|-

French queens consort
Court of Louis XIV
Regents of France
1638 births
1683 deaths
House of Bourbon (Spain)
Philip IV of Spain
Portuguese infantas
Portuguese Roman Catholics
Spanish Roman Catholics
Roman Catholic monarchs
Spanish infantas
Burials at the Basilica of Saint-Denis
17th-century House of Habsburg
17th-century women rulers
17th-century French people
17th-century Roman Catholics
17th-century Spanish people
Spanish people of Austrian descent
Castilian infantas
Aragonese infantas
Daughters of kings